Xanthé Danielle Mallett (born 17 December 1976) is a Scottish forensic anthropologist, criminologist and television presenter.  She specialises in human craniofacial biometrics and hand identification, and behaviour patterns of paedophiles, particularly online. She is a senior lecturer at the University of Newcastle in Newcastle, New South Wales, Australia.

Biography

Mallett was born in Helensburgh, Argyll and Bute and grew up in Alexandria, West Dunbartonshire, Scotland. Her father was an engineer and her mother a former dancer. Mallet herself was a dancer, and from age 9 attended the Arts Educational School in  Tring, Hertfordshire. She was also active in other sports, such as tennis, and planned to take a degree in physical education. However, a car accident severely damaged her knee and required 10 surgeries.

She received her bachelor's degree in archaeology from the University of Bradford, a master's degree in anthropology at the University of Cambridge and her doctorate in biological anthropology from the University of Sheffield.

For five years, she worked at the Centre for Anatomy & Human Identification (CAHID) at the University of Dundee, Scotland, where she was also a professor of anthropology. Mallet stated that her interest in criminology began to increase, which led her to move to Australia in 2012. "My casework experience helped me to realise that I was becoming more interested in investigating the behaviours behind the crimes, rather than identifying the victims and offenders from physical evidence they leave behind," she said. She was a senior lecturer at the University of New England in Armidale, New South Wales, before taking the same role at the University of Newcastle in Newcastle, New South Wales.

Mallett has been published in various academic journals including the International Journal of Legal Medicine and the Journal of Forensic Sciences. In 2014, she published the book Mothers Who Murder: And Infamous Miscarriages of Justice about mothers who kill their own children.

Television
Mallett worked as a forensic anthropologist on the BBC2 series History Cold Case from 2010 to 2011. The series involved Mallett and other experts working to find cause of death for human remains dating from Roman times to Victorian England. She also starred in the U.S. version of the series, which aired on the National Geographic Channel as The Decrypters.

In Australia, Mallett presented the series Wanted in 2013 and is a co-host of Coast Australia.

In 2014, she presented a television special, Mothers Who Murder, on Channel Ten that coincided with the release of her book. In the special, she met with families and police to investigate what led to the murders. One of the women she profiled was Rachel Pfitzner, who killed her 2-year-old son, Dean Shillingsworth, in 2007.

Bibliography

References

External links 

University of Newcastle, NSW profile

1976 births
Living people
Scottish anthropologists
British criminologists
Scottish expatriates in Australia
People from Alexandria, West Dunbartonshire
Alumni of the University of Bradford
Alumni of the University of Cambridge
Alumni of the University of Sheffield
Academics of the University of Dundee
Academic staff of the University of Newcastle (Australia)
Academic staff of the University of New England (Australia)
Scottish television presenters